Cunningmoor is a town in Bushbuckridge Local Municipality in the Mpumalanga province of South Africa.

References

Populated places in the Bushbuckridge Local Municipality